Bernard Nolan (23 October 1883 – 10 November 1978) was an Australian rules footballer who played for the Melbourne Football Club in the Victorian Football League (VFL) between 1904 and 1912. He was senior coach of the Richmond Football Club in 1918.

References 

 Hogan P: The Tigers Of Old, Richmond FC, Melbourne 1996

External links 

 
 
 Demon Wiki profile

1883 births
1978 deaths
Melbourne Football Club players
Melbourne Football Club captains
Richmond Football Club coaches
People from Wyndham Vale, Victoria
Australian rules footballers from Melbourne